Tokhon Kuasa Chilo is a 2021 Bengali thriller drama film directed by Saibal Mitra and produced by Pradip Churiwal. The movie is based on the novel of the same name by Syed Mustafa Siraj published in 1985. The film premiered at the 2019 Hyderabad Bengali Film Festival.

Plot
The film revolves around the life of a retired teacher Akhilbabu and his struggles as he goes against social injustice to ensure the safety of his family. He has two students, Sachin and Putu. Shachin is involved with political mafias and grows to become a goon who threats Akhilbabu with the intention to marry his granddaughter. At this juncture the teacher seeks help from another student, Putu, to save them from the goons.

Cast
 Soumitra Chatterjee as Akhilbabu
 Saswata Chatterjee
 Basabdatta Chatterjee
 Ankita Majumder

References

External links
 

2019 films
Films based on Indian novels
2010s Bengali-language films
Indian thriller drama films
2019 thriller drama films